Act of Necessity is an Australian 1991 television film about a couple who believe their daughter's cancer is caused by chemicals.

Cast 
 Angie Milliken as Louise Coleman
 Mark Owen-Taylor as Ben Coleman
 Wendy Strehlow as Cressa Buchanan
 Tim McKenzie as Brian Buchanan
 Loren Hewett as Samantha Coleman
 Stephen Grives
 Kris Graves
 Scott McGregor

References

External links

1991 television films
1991 films
Australian drama television films
Films scored by Nigel Westlake
1991 drama films
1990s English-language films